Beti Jaisi is a 2018 Pakistani soap opera drama serial directed by Amjad Hussain Khan, produced by Ali Qazi and written by Ghazala Aziz. The drama stars Maham Amir, Imran Aslam and Janita Asma in lead roles,  and was first aired on 18 July 2018 on Geo Entertainment, where it aired  Monday to Friday followed by Mera Haq. The story is about the relationship of two step sisters. This series marked the television debut of film actress Janita Asma.

Cast
Maham Amir
Imran Aslam
Janita Asma
Sabahat Ali Bukhari as Romana
Hashim Butt
Jinaan Hussain
Yasir Mazhar
Adeel Amjad
Afraz Rasool

References

2018 Pakistani television seasons
2018 Pakistani television series debuts